Radek Mach (born 28 September 1984) is a Czech male volleyball player. He is part of the Czech Republic men's national volleyball team.

References

External links
Profile at FIVB.org

1984 births
Living people
Czech men's volleyball players
Place of birth missing (living people)